This page documents all tornadoes confirmed by various weather forecast offices of the National Weather Service in the United States from January to March 2018. Tornado counts are considered preliminary until final publication in the database of the National Centers for Environmental Information.

United States yearly total

January

January 12 event

January 21 event

January 22 event

January 25 event

February

February 7 event

February 10 event

February 11 event

February 12 event

February 15 event

February 20 event

February 24 event

February 28 event

March

March 3 event

March 5 event

March 11 event

March 17 event

March 18 event

March 19 event

March 21 event

March 22 event

March 27 event

March 28 event

March 29 event

March 31 event

See also
 List of United States tornadoes from November to December 2017
 Tornadoes of 2018
 List of United States tornadoes in April 2018

Notes

References

2018 natural disasters in the United States
2018-related lists
Tornadoes of 2018
Tornadoes
2018, 01